Margarita Miriam Díaz Aroca (born 4 March 1962, in Madrid) is a Spanish actress and television presenter.

Biography 
Miriam Díaz Aroca was born on 4 March 1962 in Madrid but grew up in Santander (Cantabria). She studied Journalism in Complutense University of Madrid. She began working on Radio Minuto Fórmula of Cadena SER as a radio hostess and control technician.

Her first appearance on-screen was in the Spanish TV music program Aplauso in 1979 as a contestant on the section La juventud baila, being placed in third position (25.000 pesetas) . Professionally, she debuts accompanying Javier Basilio in the Televisión Española contest El bote de Don Basilio, which was broadcast on the program of Jesús Hermida Por la mañana (1987–88). She then went on to present a children's television show entitled Cajón desastre (1988-1991). She co-presented the television game show Un, dos, tres... responda otra vez with Jordi Estadella (1991-1993).

In 1990 she participated as a singer in an album with 11 songs called Chicos of the brand CBS, which has as a hit Merlin the Spanish version of Shattered Dreams by the English group Johnny Hates Jazz

In movies, Pedro Almodóvar selected her to play a small role as a radio hostess for the deaf in the film High Heels (1991). Her consecration as an actress would come with Clara's character in the Academy Award winning picture Belle Époque (1992), by Fernando Trueba.

Miriam has two children, a male (Pedro Luis Llorente Jr., 1994) and a female (María Washington, 2004).

She also participated as an actress in the TV comedy La casa de los líos (1996-1999) of Antena 3, with Arturo Fernandez, in the sitcom ¡Ala... Dina! (2001-2002) of TVE, and between 2004 and 2006 played the role of Claudia Valladares in Mis adorables vecinos of Antena 3. Also in 2006 she participated in the TV contest ¡Mira quién baila!. In 2009, José Luis Moreno gave her the main role in the comedy series ¡A ver si llego! with just five chapters aired given the low ratings.

She also works on theater, she took part in the Festival of Classical Theatre of Mérida in 2007 with the play Lysistrata; she starred in the 101 Dalmatians theater adaptation as Cruella de Vil; in 2009 she starred with María Barranco in the play Adulterios; and participated in 2011 with María Luisa Merlo and Jorge Roelas in the play 100 metros cuadrados of Juan Carlos Rubio.

She is the writer of the show Madame Noir of Monica Naranjo (2011).

In the fourth and final week of January 2003 she was the cover of Interviú magazine.

Filmography

Film

Television

Theatre

Others

References

Externals
Miriam Díaz-Aroca at IMDb
Official Site
Chicos

Living people
Actresses from Madrid
Spanish film actresses
Spanish stage actresses
Spanish television actresses
Spanish television presenters
20th-century Spanish actresses
21st-century Spanish actresses
1962 births
Spanish women television presenters